Brisley is a village in the English county of Norfolk located about halfway between Fakenham and East Dereham.

History
Brisley's name is of Anglo-Saxon origin and derives from the Old English for a glade or clearing with a multitude of gadflies.

Brisley is not mentioned in the Domesday Book.

In 1898, a Methodist Chapel was built in Brisley. Today it has been converted into a private dwelling.

Geography
The population at the 2011 Census was 281. For the purposes of local government it falls within the Upper Wensum Ward of Breckland District Council and the Necton and Launditch Division of Norfolk County Council.

St. Bartholomew's Church
Brisley's Parish Church is dedicated to Saint Bartholomew and is of Norman origin. The church was significantly rebuilt between 1370 and 1460 which was largely funded by East Anglia's burgeoning wool trade. St. Bartholomew's Crypt can be entered through the chancel and was used as a holding cell for prisoners on the way to Norwich.

Notable people
Richard Taverner- English theologian.

Sports
Brisley has a functioning Cricket club who play home games on the village green. They have a men's and women's team as of 2022.

War Memorial
Brisley holds a memorial to the crew of a Bristol Blenheim that crashed in the village during the Second World War on 9 June 1942. The aircraft had taken off from nearby RAF West Raynham and was part of a No. 84 Squadron RAF night bombing raid on Germany. It lists the following names:
 Pilot-Officer John G. Rappsloe (1921-1942), Pilot
 Sergeant Michael Beaufort (1923-1942), Observer
 Sergeant Leslie Harrowell (1920-1942)

Notes 

Villages in Norfolk
Civil parishes in Norfolk
Breckland District